Cheng Shicai (August 8, 1912 – November 15, 1990) was a People's Liberation Army lieutenant general. He was born in Xingchong village (杏冲村), Xuanhuadian, Dawu County, Hubei. Cheng joined the Chinese Red Army (predecessor of the People's Liberation Army) in 1930, and the Chinese Communist Party later in the same year.

He graduated from the Counter-Japanese Military and Political University (1938), the Central Party School (1944) and (after the founding of the People's Republic of China) the Advanced Course of the Nanjing Military Academy of the PLA (1951).

A veteran of both the Second Sino-Japanese War and the Chinese Civil War, he served as commander of the Andong Province Military District and participated in the Liaoshen Campaign. In April 1949, he was made commander of the Liaoxi Province Military District.

After the Communist victory in the Civil War and the establishment of the People's Republic of China, he served as deputy commander of the People's Public Security Forces (1950–1957), commander of the Shenyang city garrison (1957–1959), and, most notably, deputy commander of the PLA Armored Forces for 23 years (1959–1982).

He was a member of the 5th Standing Committee of the National People's Congress and of the Central Advisory Commission.

References

1912 births
1990 deaths
Chinese Red Army generals
Eighth Route Army generals
People's Liberation Army generals from Hubei
Members of the Standing Committee of the 5th National People's Congress
Members of the Central Advisory Commission
People from Dawu County, Hubei
Commanders of the Andong Military District
Commanders of the Liaoxi Military District
People's Republic of China politicians from Hubei
Chinese Communist Party politicians from Hubei
Politicians from Xiaogan